The Flato Markham Theatre is a public arts complex located at 171 Town Centre Boulevard in the city of Markham, Ontario, Canada.

The theatre initially opened in 1985 for local and school based productions. The theatre is best known for its performances in performing arts and drama.

The theatre is owned and operated by the City of Markham. The name of the venue changed from Markham Theatre to Flato Markham Theatre when FLATO Developments acquired naming rights in April 2012.

Facilities
 527-seat house
 Auditorium
 Multiple rooms and lounges
 Multi-level lobby with a capacity of 500 patrons
 Rehearsal hall

References

External links

Flato Markham Theatre

Theatres in Ontario
Buildings and structures in Markham, Ontario
Tourist attractions in Markham, Ontario
Music venues in Greater Toronto Area
1985 establishments in Ontario